Lady Godiva of Coventry is a 1955 American Technicolor historical drama film, directed by Arthur Lubin. It starred Maureen O'Hara in the title role. Alec Harford, the English actor who portrayed Tom the Tailor, died eight months before the film's release.

Plot
The film is set in 11th-century England. King Edward the Confessor (Eduard Franz) wants the Saxon Lord Leofric (George Nader), who rules Coventry, to marry a Norman woman, Yolanda. When he refuses, he is sentenced to jail, where he meets Godiva (Maureen O'Hara), the sheriff's sister. The two fall in love and soon they are wed. The times are turbulent and Godiva proves a militant bride; unhistorically, unrest between the Anglo-Saxon populace and the increasingly influential Norman French lead to her famous ride.

Cast
 Maureen O'Hara as Lady Godiva
 George Nader as Lord Leofric
 Victor McLaglen as Grimald
 Rex Reason as Harold
 Torin Thatcher as Lord Godwin
 Eduard Franz as King Edward
 Leslie Bradley as Comte Eustace
 Arthur Shields as Innkeeper
 Robert Warwick as Humbert
 Arthur Gould-Porter as Thorold
 Grant Withers as Pendar
 Anthony Eustrel as Prior
 Kathryn Givney as An Abbess
 Sim Iness as Oswin
 Thayer Roberts as William, Duke of Normandy
Alec Harford as Tom the Tailor 
Clint Eastwood as First Saxon

Production
In early 1954, it was announced that Maureen O'Hara would star in the film based on a script by Oscar Brodney produced by Robert Arthur. It was made at Universal, where O'Hara had a one-film-a-year contract. The script was described as "semi-historical".

Lex Barker was reportedly going to play the male lead but O'Hara objected, claiming audiences would only see him as Tarzan. Jeff Chandler was signed instead. Victor McLaglen joined the cast as Chandler's helper.

Shortly before filming began, however, Chandler was replaced by a Universal contractee, George Nader. Chandler was still making Foxfire which would finish only a day before Godiva was scheduled to start and wanted a break. Nader had previously replaced Chandler on Five Rivers to Cross after the star was suspended by the studio due to a contract dispute.

Arthur Lubin was assigned to direct. He said he did not want to but the studio would put him under suspension if he refused. He later called it "a bad picture".

Filming started on 30 August 1954.

Rex Reason joined the cast. He had previously been acting for Universal under the name "Bart Roberts" but for this film the studio allowed him to use his real name.

Maureen O'Hara filmed the famous ride wearing a leotard, with her long hair covering the rest of her body. Arthur Lubin said he was inspired by the painting of Landseer. The sequence was shot on a closed set.

Reception
Diabolique magazine later wrote "Why this movie tanked compared to other colourful costume periods of the time is a mystery – it’s bright and cheerful and stars Maureen O’Hara in all her red haired glory (she does the final ride in a body stocking, in case you’re wondering). Maybe more screen time should have been devoted to her rather than her leading man, Universal’s back up Jeff Chandler, George Nader, but I’ve always liked this movie – like so much of Lubin’s output, it was perfect Saturday afternoon TV fodder when I was growing up."

See also 

 Godiva
 List of historical drama films

See also
List of American films of 1955

References

External links
 
 Lady Godiva of Coventry at TCMDB
Review of film at Variety

1955 films
1950s historical drama films
1950s English-language films
Universal Pictures films
American films based on actual events
Films directed by Arthur Lubin
Lady Godiva
Films set in the 11th century
Films set in Coventry
American historical drama films
Cultural depictions of William the Conqueror
Films scored by Hans J. Salter
Films scored by Frank Skinner
1955 drama films
1950s American films